is the 39th single by Japanese singer/songwriter Chisato Moritaka. Written by Moritaka and Shikao Suga, the single was released by Media Factory on May 19, 1999. The song was used as the ending theme of the Hong Kong/Japanese romance film Moonlight Express.

Chart performance 
"Mahiru no Hoshi" peaked at No. 41 on Oricon's singles chart and sold 23,000 copies.

Other versions 
Moritaka re-recorded the song and uploaded the video on her YouTube channel on November 23, 2013. This version is also included in Moritaka's 2014 self-covers DVD album Love Vol. 6.

Track listing 
All lyrics are written by Chisato Moritaka; all music is arranged by Yuichi Takahashi.

Chart positions

References

External links 
 
 
 

1999 singles
1999 songs
Japanese-language songs
Chisato Moritaka songs
Songs with lyrics by Chisato Moritaka
Songs written by Shikao Suga
Media Factory